The British "Victory Bomber" was a Second World War design proposal by British inventor and aircraft designer Barnes Wallis while at Vickers-Armstrongs for a large strategic bomber. This aircraft was to have performed what Wallis referred to as "anti-civil engineering" bombing missions and was to have carried his projected  "earthquake bomb" to strategic targets in Germany. The Victory Bomber was considered extremely ambitious: the Royal Air Force (RAF) at that time not yet having introduced four-engine heavy bombers, and to give the necessary performance, the Victory Bomber was to have six engines and was highly specialised to its role.

The project was studied in detail, the bomber proceeding to wind tunnel testing while the earthquake bomb to equip it was tested on representative models. The Air Ministry chose not to proceed with development of the Victory Bomber, terminating it in May 1941. No prototypes were built, but the Avro Lancaster filled a similar role and was fitted with a similar armament array. The Lancaster used Wallis' Tallboy, Grand Slam and bouncing bomb during strategic "anti-civil engineering" missions, such as Operation Chastise, the "Dambusters" mission.

Background
During the early stages of the Second World War, Wallis performed extensive studies of the German war economy and industry, concluding that with the selective destruction of strategic infrastructure targets, the German capacity to produce armaments could be reduced. Wallis believed that a fundamental means to ending the war would be to send bombing missions against German power sources and that the destruction of facilities such as coal mines, oil depots, hydroelectric dams and water supplies would leave Germany without a functional war industry and therefore having no ability to wage war.

Wallis also spent a considerable amount of time studying the physics involved in high explosives and various bombs. As a result of these studies, Wallis conceived of more effective means to use explosives; that the shock wave that was created when munitions such as depth charges were detonated was more damaging than the initial blast of the detonation itself; he also viewed conventional bombing methods as practised by RAF Bomber Command to be insufficient on these terms to attack dispersed industrial areas. On this basis, he sought to apply this principle to a new type of weapon that would detonate underground. In 1940, Wallis designed a  "penetrating" bomb that was to bury itself in the ground before detonating. It was estimated that this bomb could be capable of breaking dams such as the Möhne if it were to explode while in the reservoirs within  of the dam's face.

Wallis argued that roughly  could be thoroughly destroyed by five aircraft each deploying only a single such bomb; this would allow for far greater levels of destruction by RAF Bomber Command as it required substantially fewer bombers to create the same levels of damage as via contemporary means. Only a small number of such equipped bombers was reasoned to be able to devastate Germany's industrial capacity to a greater extent than mass waves of conventionally-armed bombers. Wallis allegedly said that "irreparable damage could be inflicted on the strategic communications of the German Empire by ... ten or twenty machines within the course of a few weeks". However, the deployment of Wallis' concept was not immediately possible, for there was no existing Royal Air Force (RAF) bomber that would be capable of carrying such a weapon.

The limitation of the purpose of the Victory Bomber to only a single bomb and mission did not endear it to the Air Ministry, who required more flexibility of their aircraft. In mid 1940, a principle had been established that the manufacturing of only five types of aircraft should be pursued – two of these being fighter aircraft and three being bombers; Wallis' vision for a six-engine bomber equipped for only a specialised bomb conflicted with this concept. However, Lord Beaverbrook committed support for the project, co-operation from both the Ministry of Aircraft Production and the Road Research Laboratory would be forthcoming to aid Wallis in developing his plans. In August 1940, the Aeronautical Research Committee permitted the use of a wind tunnel at the National Physical Laboratory in Teddington to perform tests to develop the penetration bomb.

In May 1941, the Air Staff rejected both the Victory Bomber and the bomb, observing that the aircraft was unlikely to be completed before the war ended. The thinly-stretched resources for bombers were being mostly allocated to the already-ambitious introduction of multiple four-engine bomber projects. Aviation author Paul Brickhill notes of the decision: "It was a fair assumption that it might be disastrous to dislocate [four-engine bombers] in favour of the Victory Bomber, which would inevitably take much longer to develop." However, Wallis's concepts had drawn attention within the establishment and his concepts continued to be explored, in particular the value of attacking infrastructure such as dams was being recognised, and the concept for the weapon did not meet its demise in the May 1941 decision.

The bomber design is not believed to have been developed beyond construction of a large wooden wind tunnel model which survives today at Brooklands Museum. However, the earthquake bomb idea was continued, initially as the smaller  Tallboy bomb, and then the larger  Grand Slam bomb, the carrying aircraft being a modified Avro Lancaster, whose performance had improved during the war to the point where it could manage such a load. There was further design work on large high flying bombers by the British during the war, including 75 ton (68 tonne) and 100 ton (90 tonne) design proposals, but these did not progress either. The Bristol design work for a 100-ton bomber did have some influence on the Bristol Brabazon.

Design (as planned)
In response to the absence of a suitable aircraft, Wallis revived an earlier concept for a large six-engine bomber, known initially as the 'High Altitude Stratosphere Bomber' and later simply as the 'Victory Bomber'. The Victory Bomber had its origins in an earlier concept that the RAF had previously rejected prior to the war, having not even introduced four-engine bombers at the time, there had been some political support from figures such as Lord Beaverbrook, who had been appointed as the Minister of Aircraft Production in May 1940. In July 1940, Wallis was summoned to meet with Beaverbrook, and was able to briefly present the Victory Bomber concept to him, who in turn referred it for further study. On 1 November 1940, Sir Charles Craven, Vickers' Managing Director, wrote to Lord Beaverbrook to suggest that he give backing to both the bomb and the Victory Bomber.

Wallis' design for the huge six-engined Victory Bomber drew upon his prior experience and expertise. Wallis was an expert on geodetic airframe construction, having previously used it in designs such as the Wellesley (1935) and Wellington (1936), and naturally used it again for the Victory Bomber; also, all existing Vickers tooling was for this construction method. It would carry a single  "earthquake bomb". Defensive armament was minimal; speed and height would be its chief defence with one quad-gun turret in the tail position for any fighter aircraft that did attempt to reach it. The bomber would benefit by climbing to altitude while over Britain, where fighter defences could protect it. Due to the high altitudes that bombing missions would take place at, the crew compartment was pressurised.

Bombing from high altitudes posed several issues, principally amongst these being accuracy. In response to these difficulties, Wallis had proposed the adoption of a new gyroscopic bombsight to provide for greater accuracy. The Victory Bomber was to have been capable of traversing substantial ranges, being able to launch bombing missions upon Moscow in Russia from airfields around London in the United Kingdom; Wallis also promoted the aircraft as being the potential basis for post-war civil aircraft capable of performing direct transatlantic crossings.

Specifications (as planned)

See also
 Barnes Wallis
 Boeing B-29 Superfortress
 Amerika Bomber
 Convair B-36 Peacemaker
 Focke-Wulf Ta 400
 Heinkel He 277
 Messerschmitt Me 264
 Nakajima G10N Fugaku
 Vickers Windsor

References

Citations

Bibliography

 Andrews, Charles F. Vickers Aircraft Since 1908. London, UK: Putnam Ltd, 1960.
 Buttler, Tony. Secret Projects: British Fighters and Bombers 1935 -1950 (British Secret Projects 3). Leicester, UK: Midland Publishing, 2004. .
 Brickhill, Paul. The Dam Busters. Pan Macmillan, 2009 [Originally published: London: Evans, 1951]. .
 Edgerton, David. Britain's War Machine: Weapons, Resources, and Experts in the Second World War. Oxford University Press, 2011. .
 Holland, James. Dam Busters: The Race to Smash the Dams, 1943. Random House, 2013. .
 Jablonski, Edward. Tragic Victories. Doubleday, 1971.
 Levine, Alan J. The Strategic Bombing of Germany, 1940–1945. Westport, Connecticut: Greenwood Publishing Group, 1992. .
 Sweetman, John. Operation Chastise: The Dams Raid: Epic or Myth. Jane's, 1982. .

External links

 Sir Barnes Wallis: Wallis’s Bombs – Big and Bouncy
 Earthquake bombs on military-history.org

Cancelled military aircraft projects of the United Kingdom
Weapon development
1940s British bomber aircraft
Victory Bomber
High-wing aircraft
Six-engined tractor aircraft